69th National Board of Review Awards
December 9, 1997

Best Picture: 
 L.A. Confidential 
The 69th National Board of Review Awards, honoring the best in filmmaking in 1997, were announced on 9 December 1997 and given on 9 February 1998.

Top 10 films
L.A. Confidential
As Good as It Gets
The Wings of the Dove
Good Will Hunting
Titanic
The Sweet Hereafter
Boogie Nights
The Full Monty
The Rainmaker
Jackie Brown

Top Foreign Films
Shall We Dance?
Beaumarchais, l'insolent
Ma vie en rose
La Promesse
Ponette

Winners
Best Picture:
L.A. Confidential
Best Foreign Film:
Shall We Dance?
Best Actor:
Jack Nicholson - As Good as It Gets
Best Actress:
Helena Bonham Carter - The Wings of the Dove
Best Supporting Actor:
Greg Kinnear - As Good as It Gets
Best Supporting Actress:
Anne Heche - Donnie Brasco, Wag the Dog
Best Acting by an Ensemble
The Sweet Hereafter
Breakthrough Performance:
Bai Ling - Red Corner
Best Director:
Curtis Hanson - L.A. Confidential
Outstanding Directorial Debut:
Kasi Lemmons - Eve's Bayou
Best Documentary:
Fast, Cheap and Out of Control
Career Achievement Award:
Robert Duvall
Billy Wilder Award for Excellence in Directing:
Francis Ford Coppola
Special Achievement in Filmmaking:
Ben Affleck and Matt Damon - Good Will Hunting
William K. Everson Award for Film History
Gavin Lambert, Nazimova
Freedom of Expression:
Richard Gere and Jon Avnet - Red Corner
Special Citations:
Edward Bernds, Lifetime Achievement in Film Technology
James Cameron, Special Effects Technology, Titanic
Special Recognition for Excellence in Filmmaking:
The Apostle
Chasing Amy
The Daytrippers
Different for Girls
Gridlock'd
In the Company of Men
Star Maps
The Tango Lesson
Telling Lies in America
Welcome to Sarajevo

External links
National Board of Review of Motion Pictures :: Awards for 1997

1997
1997 film awards
1997 in American cinema